Actinotrophon tenuis is a species of sea snail, a marine gastropod mollusk in the family Muricidae, the murex snails or rock snails.

Description

Distribution

References

 Houart, R. (2001). Ingensia gen. nov. and eleven new species of Muricidae (Gastropoda) from New Caledonia, Vanuatu, and Wallis and Futuna Islands. in: P. Bouchet & B.A. Marshall (eds) Tropical Deep-Sea Benthos, volume 22. Mémoires du Muséum National d'Histoire Naturelle, ser. A, Zoologie. 185: 243–269
 Houart R. & Héros V. (2016). New species and records of deep water muricids (Gastropoda: Muricidae) from Papua New Guinea. Vita Malacologica. 15: 7–34.

tenuis
Gastropods described in 2001